John Albert Evans, Jr. (born February 18, 1956) is a former professional American and Canadian football punter and quarterback and current radio sportscaster for the North Carolina State Wolfpack football team.  He is also the Eastern NC Director for the Fellowship of Christian Athletes.  He played his college football career for NC State where he led the team to an 8-4 record his senior season, and was named MVP of the 1977 Peach Bowl.  He completed 3 years in the NFL for the Cleveland Browns and 4 years in the CFL for the Montreal Alouettes/Concordes and the Edmonton Eskimos. Since 1996 he has been the radio color commentator for NC State football.  He is the father of quadruplets, two of whom played football for NC State.

References 
 

1956 births
Living people
American football punters
American football quarterbacks
Cleveland Browns players
Edmonton Elks players
Montreal Concordes players
NC State Wolfpack football players
Sportspeople from High Point, North Carolina
Players of American football from North Carolina
Canadian football quarterbacks